Gamasiyab Rural District is a rural district (dehestan) in the Central District of Nahavand County, Hamadan Province, Iran. At the 2006 census, its population was 14,597, in 3,834 families. The rural district has 23 villages.

References 

Rural Districts of Hamadan Province
Nahavand County